Xavier High School is a private Catholic secondary school in Appleton, Wisconsin, United States, in the Diocese of Green Bay. It was opened in 1959 by the Institute of the Brothers of the Christian Schools (Christian Brothers) and the Franciscan Sisters of Christian Charity (Manitowoc Franciscans). The school was named in honor of St. Francis Xavier, the patron saint of the Green Bay Diocese.

Notable alumni
Rocky Bleier - (1964) - former NFL running back 
J. P. Hayes - (1983) - PGA Tour professional golfer
Mike Heideman - (1966) - college basketball head coach
Kristine Jarinovska - (1997) - Secretary of State, Latvia
Mee Moua - (1988) - Minnesota state senator, first Hmong-American politician
Greta Van Susteren - (1972) - TV journalist

References

External links
 

Roman Catholic Diocese of Green Bay
High schools in Appleton, Wisconsin
Lasallian schools in the United States
Catholic secondary schools in Wisconsin
Educational institutions established in 1959
1959 establishments in Wisconsin